Yeovil Without is a civil parish in the South Somerset district of Somerset, England.

It lies on the northern edge of Yeovil. It includes both suburbs of Yeovil, including the Bucklers Mead development, and rural areas including the hamlets of Yeovil Marsh and Longcroft.  The parish includes Johnson Park and Bucklers Mead Community School.  In 2011 the parish had a population of 6,834. The parish was created in 1894 from part of the large ancient parish (and later civil parish) of Yeovil.

The Parish Council is composed of five councillors from each of the wards of Brimsmore, Combe and Lyde. The parish council was formed by the Local Government Act 1894.

Governance

The parish council has responsibility for local issues, including setting an annual precept (local rate) to cover the council’s operating costs and producing annual accounts for public scrutiny. The parish council evaluates local planning applications and works with the local police, district council officers, and neighbourhood watch groups on matters of crime, security, and traffic. The parish council's role also includes initiating projects for the maintenance and repair of parish facilities, as well as consulting with the district council on the maintenance, repair, and improvement of highways, drainage, footpaths, public transport, and street cleaning. Conservation matters (including trees and listed buildings) and environmental issues are also the responsibility of the council.

The civil parish falls within the Non-metropolitan district of South Somerset, which was formed on 1 April 1974 under the Local Government Act 1972, having previously been part of Yeovil Rural District, which is responsible for local planning and building control, local roads, council housing, environmental health, markets and fairs, refuse collection and recycling, cemeteries and crematoria, leisure services, parks, and tourism.

Somerset County Council is responsible for running the largest and most expensive local services such as education, social services, libraries, main roads, public transport, policing and  fire services, trading standards, waste disposal and strategic planning.

It is also part of the Yeovil county constituency represented in the House of Commons of the Parliament of the United Kingdom. It elects one Member of Parliament (MP) by the first past the post system of election.

References

South Somerset
Civil parishes in Somerset